Darren Carter may refer to:

Darren Carter (born 1983), English footballer
Darren Carter (comedian), American actor and stand-up comedian
Darren Carter (rugby league) (born 1972), professional rugby league footballer